Byers is a city in Clay County, Texas, United States. It is part of the Wichita Falls, Texas Metropolitan Statistical Area. The population was 496 at the 2010 census.

Geography
Byers is located in northern Clay County along Texas State Highway 79.

Demographics

As of the census of 2000, there were 517 people, 213 households, and 148 families residing in the city. The population density was 528.6 people per square mile (203.7/km2). There were 229 housing units at an average density of 234.2 per square mile (90.2/km2). The racial makeup of the city was 93.81% White, 3.48% Native American, 1.74% from other races, and 0.97% from two or more races. Hispanic or Latino of any race were 2.51% of the population.

There were 213 households, out of which 29.1% had children under the age of 18 living with them, 62.0% were married couples living together, 5.2% had a female householder with no husband present, and 30.5% were non-families. 27.2% of all households were made up of individuals, and 16.0% had someone living alone who was 65 years of age or older. The average household size was 2.43 and the average family size was 2.97.

In the city, the population was spread out, with 21.7% under the age of 18, 8.3% from 18 to 24, 24.6% from 25 to 44, 27.7% from 45 to 64, and 17.8% who were 65 years of age or older. The median age was 42 years. For every 100 females, there were 88.7 males. For every 100 females age 18 and over, there were 92.9 males.

The median income for a household in the city was $39,886, and the median income for a family was $41,563. Males had a median income of $26,161 versus $18,854 for females. The per capita income for the city was $16,323. About 7.5% of families and 9.1% of the population were below the poverty line, including 6.6% of those under age 18 and 13.7% of those age 65 or over.

Education
Byers is served by the Petrolia Independent School District, including Petrolia High School.

The Byers Independent School District previously served students until its merger with Petrolia as approved by the voters in May 2012.

References

External links
 See historic photos of Byers from the Clay County Historical Society, hosted by the Portal to Texas History

Cities in Texas
Cities in Clay County, Texas
Wichita Falls metropolitan area